Fanny Létourneau (born June 24, 1979) is a Canadian former synchronized swimmer and Olympian.

Career
Létourneau was a two-time Olympian, competing for Canada in the team and duet events at the 2000 Summer Olympics in Sydney, Australia, winning a bronze medal in the team event, and at the 2004 Summer Olympics in Athens, Greece. With partner Claire Carver-Dias Létourneau won gold medals at the 1999 Pan American Games and at the 2002 Commonwealth Games in Manchester. After the 2004 Olympics, Létourneau decided to retire from the sport.

References

External links 
 
 
 
 

1979 births
Living people
Canadian synchronized swimmers
Olympic synchronized swimmers of Canada
Olympic medalists in synchronized swimming
Olympic bronze medalists for Canada
Synchronized swimmers at the 2000 Summer Olympics
Synchronized swimmers at the 2004 Summer Olympics
Medalists at the 2000 Summer Olympics
World Aquatics Championships medalists in synchronised swimming
Synchronized swimmers at the 2001 World Aquatics Championships
Commonwealth Games medallists in synchronised swimming
Commonwealth Games gold medallists for Canada
Synchronised swimmers at the 2002 Commonwealth Games
Pan American Games medalists in synchronized swimming
Pan American Games gold medalists for Canada
Pan American Games silver medalists for Canada
Synchronized swimmers at the 1999 Pan American Games
Synchronized swimmers at the 2003 Pan American Games
Swimmers from Quebec City
French Quebecers
Medalists at the 1999 Pan American Games
Medallists at the 2002 Commonwealth Games